Carp Lake may refer to:

 Carp Lake Township, Emmet County, Michigan, United States
 Carp Lake, Michigan, a census-designated place in the eastern part of the township in Emmet County
 Carp Lake Township, Ontonagon County, Michigan, United States
 Carp Lake (Minnesota/Ontario), an international lake
 "Carp Lake", an alternate name for a portion of the Leland River in Leelanau County, Michigan, United States
 "Carp Lake", historical name for Lake Paradise (Michigan), United States
 Carp Lake Provincial Park, British Columbia, Canada
 Carp Lake, a lake within the park, part of the Peace River watershed
 Carp Lake or Liyu Lake, a lake in Hualien County, Taiwan

See also
 Carp (disambiguation)
 Karp (disambiguation)